Anolis carlostoddi is a species of lizard in the family Dactyloidae. The species is found in Venezuela.

References

Anoles
Endemic fauna of Venezuela
Reptiles of Venezuela
Reptiles described in 1996
Taxa named by Ernest Edward Williams